Thomas Hilt Nilsson (9 April 1926 – 18 November 2014) was a Swedish long-distance runner. He placed 9th over 10,000 m at the 1954 European Championships, ninth in the marathon at the 1956 Summer Olympics, and 12th in the marathon at the 1958 European Championships. He won the Košice Peace Marathon in 1956, setting his personal record, and placed fifth in 1955.

References

1926 births
2014 deaths
Athletes (track and field) at the 1956 Summer Olympics
Olympic athletes of Sweden
Swedish male long-distance runners
People from Ljungby Municipality
Sportspeople from Kronoberg County